Domingos André Maciel Gonçalves (born 13 February 1989 in Barcelos) is a Portuguese cyclist, who is provisionally suspended from the sport after an anti-doping rules violation. His brother, José, is also a professional cyclist. In August 2019, he was named in the startlist for the 2019 Vuelta a España.

Major results

2011
 2nd Road race, National Under-23 Road Championships
 3rd Overall Volta a Portugal do Futuro
2013
 1st Stage 2 Volta a Portugal do Futuro
 2nd Time trial, National Road Championships
2014
 4th Tour of Almaty
 8th Tour du Finistère
2017
 1st  Time trial, National Road Championships
2018
 National Road Championships
1st  Road race
1st  Time trial
 Mediterranean Games
2nd  Time trial
10th Road race
 4th Clássica Aldeias do Xisto
 5th Clássica da Arrábida
 8th Overall GP Beiras e Serra da Estrela
 9th Overall Volta a Portugal
1st Stage 6
2019
 2nd Time trial, National Road Championships

Grand Tour general classification results timeline

References

External links

1989 births
Living people
Portuguese male cyclists
People from Barcelos, Portugal
Mediterranean Games silver medalists for Portugal
Mediterranean Games medalists in cycling
Competitors at the 2018 Mediterranean Games
Sportspeople from Braga District
21st-century Portuguese people